USCGC Bailey Barco (WPC-1122) is the United States Coast Guard's 22nd  cutter, and the second to be stationed in Alaska, where she was homeported at Coast Guard Base Ketchikan.

The vessel's manufacturer, Bollinger Shipyards, of Lockport, Louisiana, delivered the ship to the Coast Guard on February 7, 2017, for her acceptance trials. After completion sea trials, USCGC Bailey Barco was commissioned on June 14, 2017 in Juneau, Alaska.

Mission

The Sentinel-class cutters are lightly armed patrol vessels with a crew of approximately two dozen sailors, capable of traveling almost 3,000 nautical miles, on five day missions. The cutter is a multi-mission vessel intended to perform law enforcement, search and rescue, fisheries and environmental protection, and homeland security tasks.

Namesake

In 2010, Charles "Skip" W. Bowen, who was then the United States Coast Guard's most senior non-commissioned officer, proposed that all 58 cutters in the Sentinel class should be named after enlisted sailors in the Coast Guard, or one of its precursor services, who were recognized for their heroism.  In 2014 the Coast Guard announced that Bailey T. Barco, a keeper in the United States Lifesaving Service, one of the agencies merged to form the US Coast Guard, who earned a Gold lifesaving medal for managing the daring rescue of the crew of a sailing schooner that ran aground during a severe winter storm off Virginia Beach, in 1901, would be the namesake of the 22nd cutter.

References

Sentinel-class cutters
Ships of the United States Coast Guard
2017 ships
Ships built in Lockport, Louisiana